The Sahwave Mountains are a mountain range in Pershing County, Nevada. The Sahwaves are a north – south trending range typical of the Basin and Range Province.

The Sahwaves are located in southwest Pershing County with the southernmost foothills extending into Churchill County.

Surrounding ranges include the closely associated Nightingales to the west, the Truckees to the southwest, the Trinities to the southeast with Lovelock on the Humboldt River beyond. To the northeast are the Selenite Range and the small Blue Wing Mountains are directly north across the narrow Juniper Pass. Further to the northeast lie the Seven Troughs Range.

Sawhave is a name taken from the Paiute language meaning "common sage".

References 

Mountain ranges of Nevada
Mountain ranges of Churchill County, Nevada